Nadine Alari (born Bernadette Nicole Frédérique Bovarie; 23 February 1927 – 24 November 2016) was a French film and television actress.

Selected filmography
 Jericho (1946)
 Tuesday's Guest (1950)
 Great Man (1951)
 The Straw Lover (1951)
 Le dindon (1951)
 Darling Caroline (1951)
 Madame du Barry (1954)
 The Gambler (1958)
 Sun in Your Eyes (1962)
 The Sleeping Car Murders (1965)
 Amour (1970)
 A Simple Story (1978)
 The Sentinel (1992)
 The Adversary (2002)

References

Bibliography
 Ulrike Siehlohr. Heroines Without Heroes: Reconstructing Female and National Identities in European Cinema, 1945-1951. A&C Black, 2000.

External links
 

1927 births
2016 deaths
French film actresses
French television actresses
Actresses from Paris
Place of death missing